Coslada Central is a station on Line 7 of the Madrid Metro. It is located in fare Zone B1. The station offers access to Cercanías Madrid via Coslada railway station.

References 

Line 7 (Madrid Metro) stations
Railway stations in Spain opened in 2007
Buildings and structures in Coslada